The common name "brain-eating amoeba" may refer to:

 Naegleria fowleri, which causes naegleriasis, a form of primary amoebic meningoencephalitis (PAM), with a 95% incidence of fatality
 Acanthamoeba spp., which cause the slow-acting infection acanthamoebiasis, a form of granulomatous amoebic encephalitis (GAE), with a 95% incidence of fatality
 Balamuthia mandrillaris, which causes a (usually slowly) progressive brain and skin infection with varying fatality rates known as balamuthiasis 
 Paravahlkampfia francinae, which causes a form of PAM, with only one identified case
 Sappinia pedata, which causes a form of GAE, with only one identified case